Aleksandr Sergeyevich Shchipkov (born 6 April 1981) is a former Russian professional footballer. He made his professional debut in the Russian Second Division in 1999 for FC Spartak-2 Moscow.

Honours
 Russian Premier League champion: 2000.

References

1981 births
People from Reutov
Living people
Russian footballers
Association football midfielders
FC Spartak Moscow players
Russian Premier League players
FC Elista players
FC Spartak-2 Moscow players
Sportspeople from Moscow Oblast